Francescato is a surname. Notable people with the surname include:

Donata Francescato (born 1944), Italian community psychologist and academic
Enrico Francescato (born 1993), Italian rugby union player
Grazia Francescato (born 1946), Italian politician, journalist, and activist
Ivan Francescato (1967–1999), Italian rugby union player